This is a list of the tallest buildings of Haaglanden, the metropolitan area of The Hague.

See also
List of tallest buildings in the Netherlands
List of tallest buildings in Amsterdam
List of tallest buildings in Rotterdam
Haaglanden

References

Haaglanden